The Allegheny–Cumberland dry oak forest and woodland is a forest system found in Ohio, West Virginia, Virginia, Kentucky, Tennessee, Alabama, and Georgia. 

These forests occur on varied topographies, including on acidic substrates in the Allegheny and Cumberland plateaus and ridges in the southern Ridge-and-Valley Appalachians.

Flora
The Allegheny–Cumberland dry oak forest and woodlands are typically dominated by white oak (Quercus alba), southern red oak (Quercus falcata), chestnut oak (Quercus prinus), and scarlet oak (Quercus coccinea).  Less frequent are red maple (Acer rubrum), pignut hickory (Carya glabra), and mockernut hickory (Carya tomentosa). 

Shortleaf pines (Pinus echinata) or Virginia pines (Pinus virginiana) are occasionally present, particularly near escarpments or in recently burned areas. In areas that have not recently burned, white pines (Pinus strobus) may be prominent. Sprouts of chestnut (Castanea dentata) can still be found in areas where it was formerly common.

Adjacent transitions
On more base-rich substrates, this system transitions to Southern Ridge and Valley/Cumberland dry calcareous forest. To the east and north, it borders the Central Appalachian dry oak–pine forest, generally along the Allegheny Front.

References

Appalachian forests
Forests of the United States
Plant communities of Ohio
Plant communities of West Virginia
Plant communities of Virginia
Plant communities of Kentucky
Plant communities of Tennessee
Plant communities of Alabama
Plant communities of Georgia (U.S. state)